Electronic participation (e-participation) is ICT-supported participation in processes involving government and citizens. Processes may concern administration, service delivery, decision making and policy making. E-participation is hence closely related to e-government and e-governance participation. The need for the term has emerged as citizen interests and interaction with political service providers have increasingly become digitized due to the rise of e-government.

A more detailed definition sees e-participation as a process that enhances and deepens political participation and allows citizens to interact with one another as well as their elected representative through the use of information and communication technologies (ICTs). This definition includes all stakeholders in a democratic decision-making processes and not only citizen related top-down government initiatives. E-participation is largely a part of e-democracy, and heavily involves the use of ICT by governments, media, political parties and interest groups, civil society organizations, international governmental organizations, or citizens and voters within any of the political processes of regions, nations, and local and global communities.

The complexity of e-participation processes results from the large number of different participation areas, involved stakeholders, levels of engagement, and stages in policy making.

History 
The term "e-participation" originated in the early 2000s and stems from the concept of enhancing civic participation in public policies through the use of information and communication technologies (ICTs). E-participation generally draws on three developments: development of ICTs, increase in e-democracy, and growth of e-government.

The development of information and communication technologies (ICTs) is the greatest element that propelled the growth of e-participation by enabling and easing better collaboration between the public and the government. Development of CSCW (Computer Supported Cooperative Work) and groupware directed towards collaborative environments better supports human ICT-mediated interaction, both in work and social environments. Through enhanced ICT support, e-participation has evolved as a social activity involving the collaboration between politicians, administrative figures, and the public.

Developments in e-democracy since the late 1990s has also contributed to the origination of e-participation. Interest rapidly evolved from e-voting to several forms of ICT-supported and ICT-enabled interaction between governments and citizens, including not only direct ones (such as consultations, lobbying, petitioning and polling) but also ones pursued outside of government itself, including electioneering, campaigning, and community informatics. To a large extent, the institutional framework conditions of the chosen democratic model define at which part of the democratic processes participation is permitted (such as direct or representative democracy, or any intermediate forms).

The development in e-government towards increasingly complex service-delivery is another factor that contributed to the growth of e-participation. Complex services require considerable interaction including searching, selecting options based on multiple criteria, calculating outcomes, notifications, inquiries, complaints, and many other activities. There are several ICT tools for such tasks, ranging from FAQs to call centers, but there is a need to coordinate all these into user-friendly but powerful toolsets for client-organization encounters. Because interaction in such contexts is complex, and because goals have to be reached, the arenas where it takes places become social arenas for ICT-supported participation

On the Definition 
Participation is a goal-oriented process that involves decision making and control. E-participation, which encompasses participation in political science and theory of management, refers to direct public participation in political, economical, or management decisions. When participation becomes complicated, decision making becomes necessary and any participatory process is potentially important for the rule system governing the activities. In this sense, when service processes become complex, the implementation of them will not be in all details based on political decisions but also on what is found to be practical.

Instead of taking in and accepting knowledge as is disseminated by the media and government, by participating, one becomes an active citizen and further contributes to a democratic society. When such practical doings become implemented in government e-service systems, they will affect decision making, as later changes will be difficult to make after existing procedures have been implemented in ICT systems and government agencies’ procedures. There are many theories dealing with institutionalization, for example structuration theory, institutional theory, and actor-network theory. These different theories all deal with how methods of operation becomes established or rejected, and how those that become established increasingly affect the ways society habitually accomplish tasks. Alternatively, when viewed from the citizen's perspective, the capability approach is being applied to understand the behaviors of individuals. This approach allows institutions to identify normative capabilities that can improve citizen's opportunities to participate in the governance process.

E-participation Index 
The e-participation index (EPI) was designed by the UN Department of Economic and Social Affairs as "a supplementary index to the UN E-Government Survey". The EPI is used to evaluate the effectiveness of online services that propels the interaction and exchange of information between government and individuals, as well as the engagement of citizens in policy and decision-making. It is evaluated on the basis of how well a government relays information to its constituents, how engaged citizens are in the designing of policies, and how empowered citizens feel in the decision-making process, together these factors make up the framework of "e-information", "e-consultation", and "e-decision making". Specifically, the index is calculated by subtracting the lowest e-participation score from the e-participation score of the country, then divided by the range of scores for all countries. The resulting index score is a foundation measure that captures how inclusive a government is.

Models and tools 
A number of tools and models have emerged as part of Web 2.0 that can be used or inspire the design of architecture for e-participation. In particular, "the emergence of online communities oriented toward the creation of useful products suggests that it may be possible to design socially mediating technology that support public-government collaborations" .

Participation tools 
 Social networking services, such as popular media platforms and blogs, have built online platforms that makes it possible for people to connect with others and participate in interactive activities. Social activities such as the engagement between citizens and government agencies have been facilitated by online platforms and social networking has been increasingly used by the government to keep up with public trends and identify political issues people are most passionate about. Popular platforms such as Twitter and Facebook has allowed users to actively engage in politics online by expressing their political standpoints and opinions as well as organize movements to bring attention to issues of importance. The instantaneous sharing and response mechanisms social networking platforms generate has become an important tool of e-participation that enables citizens to engage in decision-making and government agencies to take initiative in addressing public concerns. 
Wikis are another way people can participate collaboratively online with others, although not directly with politicians and government administrators. The evolving and collaborative nature of wikis allows citizens to contribute to topics they are knowledgeable about and share that knowledge with others who want to learn about it. At the same time, it allows for debate about the topic and interaction between different contributors. The ease of updating articles allows each topic to be up to date and present viewers with the most recent and comprehensive understanding of each topic. Wikis can be tools to facilitate and inspire e-participation by allowing people to bring attention to certain movements and issues and informing others of the impact of potential issues.

Mechanisms 
 Electronic voting generally comes in two different forms: e-voting physically such as electronic voting machines at polling stations, or remote e-voting through the Internet. Remote e-voting is a powerful tool that contributes to e-participation by offering the ability to vote from anywhere at anytime, which reduces the time and cost of voting. This can lead to an increase in voter turnout and civic engagement as it increases citizen's accessibility to offer their support for different policies and political figures. Especially with the rise of blockchain technology, the security and transparency of electronic voting has been drastically improved and the decentralized nature of blockchain technologies can transform the model of electronic voting in the future. However, there are obvious drawbacks with e-voting, most clearly seen in the digital inequality of the country. Electronic voting can emphasize and enhance the digital divide between people of different socioeconomic backgrounds and age groups, and the technology may not be accessible to all. In this sense, e-voting can alienate those without access to technology and stable internet access, and in fact hinder citizen engagement rather than facilitate it.
 Internet petitions have become a popular platform for citizens to engage in policy reviewing and issue petitioning. Internet petitions allow for flexibility and ease to achieve political impact and to voice concerns about urging issues both socially and politically. It increases citizen engagement while also allowing administration to be more responsive to the opinions and needs of the population. Petitioning platforms created by the government such as We The People is directly linked to administration officials who can provide response and propel important movements. Internet petitions contributes a greater citizen participation and in return, a more inclusive relationship between government and society.
Quadratic voting is another emerging technology that uses blockchain technology to facilitate e-participation. Quadratic voting allows citizens to express how strongly they feel about a policy by assigning individuals with a set amount of tokens, then allowing them to vote multiple times with the tokens to express urgency or passion for the policy they feel most strongly about. Quadratic voting enables more flexibility and interactivity in the voting process. The idea of expressing the "strength" of voter's voices and opinions more clearly in the voting process increases the engagement of citizens and shows more feedback about certain issues and policies than a traditional voting system can.
Reputation systems 
 Transparency tools (social translucence mechanisms)

Tracking and analysis 

 Digital traces
 Data mining
 Data visualization
 Simulations such as agent-based social simulation

Crowdsourcing 
To demonstrate e-participation at work, one can turn to one of its types - crowdsourcing. This is generally defined as the enlisting of a group of humans to solve problems via the World Wide Web. The idea is that this platform is able to collect human resources from the most unlikely and remotest places, contributing to the general store of intellectual capital. Crowdsourcing can be applied in different stages of the policy-making process and these could transpire on the information, consultation, and active participation levels. At the information level, there is a one-way relationship, wherein the participants receive information from the government. The consultation process entails a two-way interaction where citizens already provide their inputs, feedback, and reactions. Finally, active participation can refer to the deeper participatory involvement where citizens directly contribute in the formulation of policy content. This level of e-participation is increasingly being practiced through tools such as online petition, e-referendum, e-panels, citizen e-juries, and participatory GIS, among others.

Challenges of e-participation 
One of the biggest challenges to e-participation is the existence of a digital divide, as e-participation highly relies on access to new technologies as well as access to stable Internet connections. Oftentimes, e-participation also requires a higher digital literacy such as skills to digitally analyze policy proposals and provide input in a digital sphere. In addition, Internet safety and collaboration are also abilities and knowledge needed to better navigate tools for e-participation. These, along with physical access to technology, exist as barriers to people of different socioeconomic levels and those who lack or can not afford access to these technologies. The digital divide hinders and limits the ability for certain groups to voice their opinions, which in return excludes them from participation, backfiring the initial goal of e-participation.

European eParticipation actions

European eParticipation Preparatory Action 
eParticipation is preparatory actions  have been conducted for three years (2006–2008). The EU is taking the lead in using online tools to improve the legislative process for its citizens. eParticipation which launched on January 1, 2007, will run as a series of linked projects which each contribute to a greater awareness and involvement by citizens in the legislation process from initial drafting to implementation at a regional and local level.

The individual projects will concentrate on ensuring that the legislative language and process is more transparent, understandable and accessible to citizens. In addition the projects emphasis on the communication of legislation will be used to enhance and grow citizens' involvement and contribution in the process of creating and implementing the legislation.

So far, 21 projects have been funded. The European Parliament, national parliaments and local and regional authorities are actively involved. State-of-the-art ICT tools are being tested to facilitate the writing of legal texts, including translation into different languages, and the drafting of amendments as well as making the texts easier for non-specialists to find and understand. New digital technologies are also being used to give citizens easier access to information and more opportunity to influence decisions that affect their lives. A report , which was published as a MOMENTUM white paper, highlights the major facts and figures of those projects while providing some initial policy recommendations for future use.

European eParticipation Actions 
The European Commission has now launched a number of actions aiming at further advancing the work of supporting eParticipation.

Examples:
 FP7 : ICT Challenge 7 : Objective ICT-2009.7.3 ICT for Governance and Policy Modelling. The European Commission has launched some call in this area to finance researches. Currently the Integrated Program Future Policy Modelling (FUPOL) is the largest project in this domain. FUPOL
 CIP ICT Policy Support Programme (or ICT PSP). The European project has open a call in the programme CIP (Competitiveness and Innovation Framework) on the Theme 3: ICT for government and governance

See also

Collaborative e-democracy
Direct democracy
E-democracy
eGovernment
Electronic civil disobedience
eRulemaking
Emergent democracy
Hacktivism
Internet activism
Online consultation
Online deliberation
Online participation
Online petition
Open politics
Open source governance
Parliamentary informatics
Participatory democracy
Radical transparency
Second Superpower
Smart mob
Spatial Citizenship
Social translucence
Virtual volunteering
 YoDono

Notes

References

Huffman, B. (2017). "E-Participation in the Philippines: A Capabilities Approach to Socially Inclusive Governance". JeDEM - eJournal of EDemocracy and Open Government. 9 (2): 24–46. doi:10.29379/jedem.v9i2.461. ISSN 2075-9517.

External links
Democracies Online Newswire

Organizations

International
World e-Gov Forum
Detailed list of participatory governance projects
E-participation Country Index -Provides an index on E-participation
ICEGOV - International Conference on Electronic Governance
Internet Society Organization home for the groups responsible for Internet infrastructure standards, including the Internet Engineering Task Force (IETF) and the Internet Architecture Board (IAB).
International Teledemocracy Centre, Napier University, Edinburgh

Europe
FUPOL: Future Policy Modelling project
MOMENTUM: The European Commission Support Action in eParticipation
PEP-NET: Pan European eParticipation Network
European eParticipation Portal
TID+: the software suite developed for the Estonian public participation portal, also used by the Slovenian government

E-democracy
Democracy
Collective intelligence
Active citizenship